Shamsabad (also Romanized as Shamsābād; also known as Shamsavar and Shamseh Vār) is a village in the Sabalan District of Sareyn County, Ardabil Province, Iran. At the 2006 census, its population was 289 in 63 families.

References 

Towns and villages in Sareyn County